Gerrit van Santen or Gerard Cornelisz van Santen (1591/92–1656) was a Dutch Golden Age painter and writer. He was born in Delft probably in 1591 or 1592, and was buried in the city on 26 April 1656.

Career

Author
Van Santen's farce Lichte Wigger was printed in Leiden in 1617. It was performed by the Amsterdam Chamber of Rhetoric in 1635, and reprinted the same year. It was followed by a series of other comedic pieces in the 1620s, including a volume of epigrams printed under the titleTijd-Verdrijfjes ("Little Pastimes").

Painter
In 1629 Van Santen was admitted to the Guild of St Luke in The Hague. Between 1637 and 1650 several payments were made by Frederick Henry, Prince of Orange for paintings of battles and sieges (including the siege of Hulst, siege of Sas van Gent, and siege of Schenkenschans).

Works

Author
Lichte Wigger', 1617Snappende Sytgen, 1620Van t'een op t'aer, 1624Keurelycke Neeltge, 1625Stomme-boden ofte brieven, 1625Graefs wandelpraetje, 1626Tijd-verdrijfjes, 1626Gierigheids misprijsing ende weldoens lof en loon"", 1629

Painter
Cavalry Battle, 1635, auctioned in Stockholm 1996
Cavalry Battle, 1640, auctioned in London 1981
Siege of Schenkenschans, ca.1645, Rijksmuseum, Amsterdam
Battle of Lekkerbeetje, ca. 1650, Gouda city hall

References

1590s births
1656 deaths
17th-century Dutch writers
Dutch Golden Age painters
Dutch male painters
Artists from Delft